Ijamsville is an unincorporated community in Pleasant Township, Wabash County, in the U.S. state of Indiana.

History
Ijamsville was platted in 1872. An old variant name of the community was called South Laketon.

A post office was established at Ijamsville in 1874, and remained in operation until it was discontinued in 1923.

Geography

References

Unincorporated communities in Wabash County, Indiana
Unincorporated communities in Indiana
Populated places established in 1872
1872 establishments in Indiana